Sandy Glacier is an alpine glacier located on the west slope of Mount Hood in the U.S. state of Oregon. The glacier is the source of Muddy Fork, a tributary of the Sandy River. The upper extent of the glacier is known for extensive crevasses. The lower extent was marked by the Sandy Glacier Caves, possibly the largest glacier cave system in the lower 48 U.S. states.

The glacier is a remnant of the massive glaciers that formed during the last ice age.  It is bounded on the south by Yocum Ridge which also defines the northern side of Reid Glacier, and by a ridge on the north which defines part of the Hood River-Clackamas county border which also bounds the south side of Glisan Glacier.  The glacier lies entirely within Mount Hood Wilderness.

Sandy Glacier decreased in area by 40% between 1907 and 2004.

See also
List of glaciers in the United States
Wrenn Peak

References

Glaciers of Mount Hood
Glaciers of Clackamas County, Oregon
Mount Hood National Forest
Glaciers of Oregon